Iveagh is the name of several historical territorial divisions in what is now County Down, Northern Ireland.

Iveagh may also refer to:

Places
 Iveagh (Northern Ireland Parliament constituency), based on the baronies
 Baronies of Ireland
 Iveagh Lower, Lower Half
 Iveagh Lower, Upper Half
 Iveagh Upper, Lower Half
 Iveagh Upper, Upper Half
 Mount Iveagh, Antarctica

People
 Earl of Iveagh, a British peerage of the Guinness family
 Viscount Magennis of Iveagh, an Irish Peerage title 1623–93

Other uses
 Iveagh House, Dublin HQ of the Irish Department of Foreign Affairs
 Iveagh Primary School, in Rathfriland, County Down
 Iveagh Grounds, a sports ground in Dublin
 Iveagh Market, Dublin
 Iveagh Trust, a housing association
 Iveagh United F.C., Dunmurry

See also
 , the clan from whose name Iveagh derives